Clinidium talamanca is a species of ground beetle in the subfamily Rhysodinae. It was described by Ross Bell & J.R. Bell in 2009. It is endemic to the eponymous Cordillera de Talamanca in Puntarenas Province, Costa Rica.

Clinidium talamanca measure  in length.

References

Clinidium
Beetles of Central America
Endemic fauna of Costa Rica
Beetles described in 2009